Kornaka is a village and rural commune in Niger. It is the birthplace of politician Sanoussi Jackou.

References

Communes of Maradi Region